Johny Lahure (24 March 1942 – 23 November 2003) was a Luxembourgish politician.  He served as the Minister for the Environment from 1994 until 1998, under both Jacques Santer and Jean-Claude Juncker.  In this capacity, as Luxembourg was chairing the Council of the European Union in the second half of 1997, Lahure conducted negotiations on behalf of the European Union that led to the Kyoto Protocol.

Ministers for the Environment of Luxembourg
Members of the Chamber of Deputies (Luxembourg)
Members of the Council of State of Luxembourg
Councillors in Bettembourg
Luxembourg Socialist Workers' Party politicians
1942 births
2003 deaths
People from Differdange